William Edward Waggonner (August 7, 1905 – May 9, 1976) was an American sheriff. He served as the sheriff in Bossier Parish, Louisiana from 1948 to 1976. 

Born in Plain Dealing, Louisiana, the brother of politician Joe Waggonner. Waggonner attended at the Plain Dealing Middle/High School, where he later graduated. He served as a member of the Plain Dealing Masonic Lodge, with also being a member of the Plain Dealing Lions Club and Bossier Chamber of Commerce. In the 1960s, Waggonner was apart of rodeo performer Jack Favor's falsely accused murder and robbery case, in which he was exceedingly concerned along with district attorney Louis H. Padgett Jr. for which the case was solved.

Waggonner died in May 1976 of a heart attack at his home in Plain Dealing, Louisiana, at the age of 70. According to his The Times obituary, he survived at least three heart attacks.

References 

1905 births
1976 deaths
People from Plain Dealing, Louisiana
Louisiana sheriffs
American deputy sheriffs
Louisiana Democrats